Harmeet Singh Pathanmajra is an Indian politician and the MLA representing the Sanour Assembly constituency in the Punjab Legislative Assembly. He is a member of the Aam Aadmi Party.  He was elected as the MLA in the 2022 Punjab Legislative Assembly election.

Member of Legislative Assembly
Pathanmajra represents the Sanour Assembly constituency since 2022 after winning the election.

In the 2022 Punjab Legislative Assembly election he contested from Sanour as a member of the Aam Aadmi Party and defeated Shiromani Akali Dal's Harinder Pal Singh Chandumajra by a large margin of 49,122 votes. The Aam Aadmi Party gained a strong 79% majority in the sixteenth Punjab Legislative Assembly by winning 92 out of 117 seats in the 2022 Punjab Legislative Assembly election. MP Bhagwant Mann was sworn in as Chief Minister on 16 March 2022.

Committee assignments of Punjab Legislative Assembly
Member (2022–23) Committee on Estimates
Member (2022–23) Committee on Government Assurances

Electoral performance

References

External links
 
 

Living people
Punjab, India MLAs 2022–2027
Aam Aadmi Party politicians from Punjab, India
Year of birth missing (living people)